TNT Sports is a subsidiary of Warner Bros. Discovery in Brazil responsible for sports broadcasts on TNT and Space channels in the country.

Esporte Interativo started as a television channel, inaugurated on January 20, 2007 with the live broadcast of a Premier League match between Chelsea and Liverpool. From 2015, it became part of Turner Broadcasting System Latin America. Turner announced in 2018 the discontinuation of all EI channels in Brazil. Part of the programming, such as the exhibition of national and international football championships, started to be shown on the Brazilian versions of TNT and Space channels. With the standardization of Turner's sports channels in Latin America, it started to use the TNT Sports brand as of 2021.

History

Partnership with RedeTV! and Rede Bandeirantes 
The plan of the Esporte Interativo channel started in 2004, when the marketing agency TopSports launch the brand Esporte Interativo and established a partnership with the TV network RedeTV! to broadcast sports events like English Premier League, UEFA Champions League and NBA. In September 2004, after fights between TopSports and RedeTV!, the partnership was broken. Esporte Interativo took their events to Rede Bandeirantes, in three years of partnership it broadcast events like UEFA Champions League, La Liga, English Premier League and Lega Calcio.

Own channel and growth  
On January 20, 2007 the Esporte Interativo channel started to broadcast free-to-air on satellite Star One C2, on the frequency 980 MHz vertical, replacing Amazon Sat.
On June 10, 2010 the Esporte Interativo channel started to broadcast in São Paulo, channel 36 UHF, and was created the Rede Esporte Interativo, to debut the network an interview with Brazilian president, Luiz Inácio Lula da Silva, was aired. In 2011 the network renewed the broadcast rights for the UEFA Champions League, and gained the broadcast rights for UEFA Super Cup and UEFA Europa League. To celebrate the 5th birthday of the channel, was opened a new studio in São Paulo.

In July 2012, Esporte Interativo launched their new SVOD multiplatform product EI Plus in partnership with Log On, and in October, closed a partnership with Yahoo! Brasil and they launched a new sports website, the Yahoo! Esporte Interativo.

In 2013 the Turner Broadcasting System acquired 20% of the network, becoming a business partner and occupying 2 of 7 members in the administration of the network.

In August was announced a new channel of the network, the Esporte Interativo Nordeste, a regional sports network dedicated for the sports from Brazilian northeast, and the acquisition of six state's championships of the region.

Full purchase by Turner and third channel 
In early 2015, Turner Broadcasting Company, the television arm of Time Warner, has closed a total purchase of Esporte Interativo, acquiring the part that was owned by Top Sports, Edgar Diniz marketing agency.

From January 26, 2015, when the contract was signed, Turner started to control the entire channel. The programmer provides high investments and a new time in EI, particularly in the technical apparatus. 2015 also saw the debut of a new channel, EI Max. Soon after, EI Nordeste was renamed EI Maxx and EI Max became EI Maxx 2.

As of July 1, 2017, EI Maxx was renamed Esporte Interativo and EI Maxx 2 was renamed Esporte Interativo 2. As a result, the free-to-air channel was renamed Esporte Interativo BR. In addition to the nomenclature change, the three channels also get a new graphic project.

End of the EI channels, moving to TNT and Space  
On August 9, 2018, the channel announced on its Facebook page the deactivation of all of their TV channels in 40 days and moving all of their sports events to TNT and Space channels in Brazil, on their social media and on the over-the-top service EI Plus.

TNT Sports (Brasil)
On January 8, 2021, WarnerMedia, the parent company of Turner, announced the replacement of the Esporte Interativo brand by TNT Sports, a name that had been used since 2017 by a sports channel of the conglomerate in Argentina, and which would now serve for pan-regional standardization in Latin America. The new brand was officially adopted at midnight on January 17 across all of the group's social media, including EI Plus, which is now renamed Estádio TNT Sports. On television, the TNT Sports brand officially debuted during the match between Internazionale x Juventus, valid for the Serie A.

Exhibitions

Competitions

Football

Brazil 
 Campeonato Paulista
 Campeonato Paulista Série A2
 Campeonato Paulista Under-20
 Campeonato Paulista de Futebol Feminino

Chile 
Chilean Primera División

International 
UEFA Champions League
UEFA Super Cup
UEFA Youth League

Basketball 
NBA (only on Youtube)

e-Sports 
Liga Brasileira de Free Fire
Kick-off Electronic League

Professional wrestling 
 All Elite Wrestling

Programming 
A Hora do Jogo
Matchday
De Olho na Liga
Liga Espetacular
Último Lance
EI Games
De Placa
MFM Debate
Polêmicas Vazias
Quem Quer Ser Um Idiota
 Formigados Talk Show
TNT Sports Live

Slogans 
 2007–08: Agora, muito mais emoção! (Now, much more excitement!)
 2008, 2010: Aqui a emoção não para! (The excitement never stops!)
 2009: Sem limite para a sua emoção! (No limit for your excitement!)
 2009: Rio 2016, O Esporte Interativo apoia e você? (Rio 2016, The Esporte Interativo supports, and you?)
 2010–12: Esporte Interativo, paixão ao alcance de todos! (Esporte Interativo, passion within everyone's reach!)
 2012: Esporte Interativo, 5 anos torcendo junto com você. (Esporte Interativo, 5 years cheering along with you.)
 2013: Esporte Interativo, nordestino de coração! (Esporte Interativo, from northeast by heart!)
 2013: Copa do Nordeste: Esporte Interativo, o nordeste merece. (Esporte Interativo, the northeast deserves it.)
 2013–15: Esporte Interativo, emoção que o Brasil merece. (Esporte Interativo, the emotion Brasil deserves.)
 2015–17: Esporte Interativo, aqui é com emoção de verdade.  (Esporte Interativo, here is with real emotion)
 2017–18: Esporte Interativo, movido por sonhos.  (Esporte Interativo, moved by dreams)
 2021–present: TNT Sports, paixão sem limites (TNT Sports, love without limits)

References

External links
 

Portuguese-language television stations in Brazil
Television channels and stations established in 2007
Mass media in Rio de Janeiro (city)
Sports television networks in Brazil
2007 establishments in Brazil